Camucia is a small town in Tuscany in central Italy. It is a frazione of Cortona. Sitting at the base of the hill on which Cortona lies, it serves as the railway station for the historic town, on the main Florence - Rome line.

References 

Frazioni of the Province of Arezzo
Cities and towns in Tuscany
Cortona
Railway towns in Italy